Disney Junior is a British-managed Polish pay television preschool channel owned and operated by The Walt Disney Company Limited in London, England. Initially part of the pan-CEMA feed. It was originally launched as Fox Kids Play in January 2003, it was later rebranded as Jetix Play on 1 January 2005, and Playhouse Disney on 1 September 2010, On 1 June 2011, the channel was later rebranded as Disney Junior.

See also
 Disney Junior
 Disney Channel (Poland)
 Disney XD (Poland)
 Jetix Play

References

External links
Official schedule

Television channels and stations established in 2010
2010 establishments in Poland
Children's television networks
Poland